George DeWitt Mason (July 4, 1856 – June 3, 1948) was an American architect who practiced in Detroit, Michigan, in the latter part of the 19th and early decades of the 20th centuries.

Biography

George Mason was born in Syracuse, New York, the son of James H. and Zelda E. Mason. In 1870 the family moved to Detroit, where Mason received his early education.

He began his architectural career working for Detroit architect Hugh Smith in 1875, but this only lasted a summer. After this he moved to the firm of Henry T. Brush, where he worked for the first nine months without pay. Mason started out assigned to some specific detailing work on the George O. Robinson House and the Detroit Public Library. One of the first buildings in which Mason received equal billing for the design was the Ransom Gillis House. In 1878 he joined with Zachariah Rice to form the firm Mason & Rice. This partnership lasted until 1898, after which time Mason continued his practice alone.

From 1884 until 1896 Albert Kahn worked with Mason and Rice, and he returned to partner with Mason for a few years early in the 20th century.

He married Ida Whitaker in 1882, and they had one daughter.

A number of Mason's works, either by himself or as part of Mason & Rice, are listed on the National Register of Historic Places.

Mason died on June 3, 1948, at his home in the Wilshire Apartments building, at the age of 91. He was buried at Evergreen Cemetery in Detroit.

Selected commissions

All buildings are located in Detroit, unless otherwise indicated.

Works include (with attribution):

Ransom Gillis House 205 Alfred Street (with Henry T Brush) (1876 or 1878)
James P Donaldson House, (with Rice) 82 Alfred Street (1879)
D.M Ferry Company Building (with Rice) 416-434 Monroe (1879) destroyed by fire in 1886.
Cadillac Scuere Central Market Building (with Rice) (1880), demolished in 1899.
Michigan Central Railroad Chelsea Depot (with Rice), Chelsea, Michigan (1880)
Peninsular Stove Company Building (with Rice) 1401 West Fort Street (1882). Demolished.
Michigan Malleable Iron Company Building (with Rice) 2755-2765 West Jefferson (1882) Demolished.
John Burt Residence (with Rice) 5421 Woodward Avenue (1882) Extensively altered by Mason & Rice for Mrs.Clorinda L. Stephens in 1891.Demolished in 1920s
Wells Burt Residence (with Rice) 5435 Woodward Avenue (1882) Demolished in 1912 for the Lamuel W Bowen house also designed by Mason.
Joseph H Berry Residence (with Rice) 50 Lake Shore Drive, Grosse Pointe Farms, Michigan (1882) Demolished in 1903.
Cass Avenue Methodist Episcopal Church (with Rice) (1883) (chapel only; while the building stands, it has been totally refaced) 901 Cass Avenue.
David Carter Residence (with Rice) 5024 Woodward Avenue (1883). Demolished in 1920s.
George L'Hommedieu Residence (with Rice) 26 Peterboro Street (1883). Demolished in 1923.
John B. Dyar Residence (with Rice) 65 Lakeshore Drive (1883) Grosse Pointe Farms, Michigan. Demolished in 1942.
City Hall Marine City (with Rice) (1884) (300 Broadway Marine City, MI)  (Richardson Romanesque)
Thompson Home (with Rice) 4756 Cass Avenue (1884)
Mary W. Palmer Memorial Methodist Episcopal Church (with Rice) 2972 East Lafayette (1884). Demolished in 1960s.
George and Martha Hitchcock House (with Rice), Farwell, Michigan (1885)
Residence in 39 Peterboro (with Rice) (1885)
Palmer Park Log Cabin (with Rice) (1885)
Woodbridge Street Station-Detroit Metropolitan Police Department (with Rice) 17 East Woodbridge. (1885) Demolished in 1940s
Most Holy Trinity Rectory (with Rice) (1886) 1050 Porter.
Joshua S. Ingalls Residence (with Rice) 68 Stimson (1886). Demolished in 1960s.
Y. M. C. A. Building (with Rice) 30-40 West Grand River (1886). Demolished in 1966.
Grand Hotel (with Rice), Mackinac Island (1887)
Sidney B. Dixon House (with Rice) 114 East Warren (1887). Demolished in 1922.
Charles A. DuCharme Residence (with Rice) 2165 East Jefferson Avenue (1887). Demolished in 1959.
Henry A. Newland Residence (with Rice) 141 Lakeshore Drive (1887) Demolished.
Walkerville Passenger Depot (with Rice) Walkerville, Windsor, Ont. (1888) Demolished.
Engine #15-Detroit Fire Department (with Rice) 775 Hubbard. (1888) Demolished.
Charles W. Casgrain Residence (with Rice) 618 W Lafayette Boulevard (1888). Demolished in 1930s
William C. McMillan Summer Residence (with Rice) 91 Lakeshore Drive, Grosse Pointe Farms, Michigan (1888) Demolished.
650-658-668-674-684-692 Devonshire Road, Walkerville Windsor, Ontario Canada (with Rice) (1888)
510-536, Kildare Road,Walkerville Windsor, Ontario Canada (with Rice) (1888)
Lake Erie, Essex & Detroit River Railway Company Station (with Rice) 169 Landsdowne Avenue (1888)
Gilbert W Lee House (with Rice) 201 East Ferry Avenue (1888). Demolished in 1960s
Jacob S. Farrand Jr Residence (with Rice) 2733 Woodward Avenue (1889). Demolished in 1920s
William V. Moore Residence (with Rice) 5201 Woodward Avenue (1889). Demolished in 1921 for the Detroit Public Library.
George G. Booth Residence (with Rice) 3661 Trumbull (1889). Demolished in 1960s
First Presbyterian Church (with Rice) 2930 Woodward Avenue (1889)
Detroit Business University Building (with Rice) 35-37 East Grand River (1889). Demolished in 1960s
William C. McMillan Residence (with Rice) 1301-1305 East Jefferson Avenue/418 Rivard (1889). Demolished in 1940s
Sievers and Erdman Carriage Works Building (with Rice) 506 East Jefferson Avenue (1889). Demolished in 1960s.
Trinity Episcopal Church (with Rice) 1519 Martin Luther King Boulevard (1890)
Columbus Buggy Company Building (with Rice) 323-325 East Jefferson (1890). Demolished in 1970s
Samuel T. Douglas Residence (with Rice) 500 Dubois (1890). Demolished in 1960s
Albert L. Stephens Residence (with Rice) 5414 Woodward Avenue (1890). Demolished in 1926 for the Park-Shelton Hotel
514-518 Devonshire Road,Walkerville Windsor, Ontario Canada.(with Rice) (1890)
546-548 Devonshire Road,Walkerville Windsor, Ontario Canada.(with Rice) (1890)
580 Devonshire Road,Walkerville Windsor, Ontario Canada.(with Rice) (1890)
Renovation of John Burt House for Clarinda L. Stephens Detroit, Michigan. (1891)
Mrs. Newell C. (Nancy) Avery. (with Rice) 91 Eliot Street (1891). Demolished in 1960s
James E. Scripps House (with Rice) (1891) (additions) Demolished in 1980s
James H. McMillan. Residence (with Rice) 2201 East Jefferson Avenue (1892). Demolished in 1961.
Henry G. Sherrard Residence (with Rice) 59 Lakeshore Drive, Grosse Pointe Farms, Michigan (1892)
Engine House No. 18 (with Rice) (1892)
The Crown Inn (with Rice) 378-396 Devonshire Road, Walkerville, Windsor Ontario (1893)
4439 French Road (with Rice) (1893)
4007 French Road (with Rice) (1893)
3810 Montclair (with Rice) (1893)
4440 Montclair (with Rice) (1893)
Belle Isle Police Station (with Rice) (1893)
Thomas W. Palmer Building (with Rice) 400 West Larned (1894). Demolished in 1970s
Hiram Walker and Sons Building (with Rice), Windsor, Ontario (1894)
William Livingstone Jr Residence (with Rice) 74 Eliot Street (1894). Demolished in 2007.
James E. Scripps Stable (with Rice) 3664 Trumbull (1894) Demolished in 2016
First Masonic Temple (with Rice) 459 W Layafette Boulevard (1895). Demolished in 1936.
Mouat Flats (with Rice) 4141 Lincoln (1895). Demolished
A. C. Thompson Residence (with Rice) 2710 East Jefferson Avenue (1895). Demolished in 1940s
Watson M. Freer Residence (with Rice) 111 East Ferry Avenue (1895). Demolished in 1960s
Engine #20 Detroit Fire Department (with Rice) 7661 Gratiot Avenue (1896). Demolished in 1953.
Engine #21 Detroit Fire Department (with Rice) 5962 Lincoln (1896). Demolished
Engine #22 Detroit Fire Department (with Rice) 6140 Michigan Avenue (1896)
Franklin H. Walker House (with Rice) 2730 East Jefferson (1896). Demolished in 1990s
Alexander H. McDonnell Residence (with Rice) 100 Virginia Park (1896)
Engine #4 Detroit Fire Department (with Rice) 1071 Eighteenth Street (1897).
Belle Island Park Stables (with Rice) corner of Loiter Way and Inselruhe (1897)
Thomas Witherell Palmer Summer residence (with Rice) (1897). Demolished.
Detroit Second Opera House (with Rice) (1898). Demolished in 1966.
Berry Brothers Office Building (1900) 3700 Wight. Demolished.
Delray Savings Bank (1900)  7870 West Jefferson. Demolished in 1918.
First Presbyterian Church (1900) 2803 First Street, Wyandotte, MI. Demolished.
William M. Finck Residence (1901) 649 Van Dyke Street.
Taylor Water Tube Boiler Company (1902) 1440 Franklin Street.
Edward H. Doyle Residence (1902) 961 Burns.
William C. Anderson Residence (1902) 215 Mack Avenue. Demolished in 1960s.
Century Theatre (1903)
Colonial Theatre (1903) 755 E Superior Avenue, Cleveland, Ohio. Demolished in 1932.
Palms Apartments (with Kahn) (1903)
Belle Isle Aquarium (with Kahn) (1904)
Detroit Savings Bank Branch (1904) 5459 West Vernor.
West Engineering Building, University of Michigan (with Kahn), Ann Arbor, Michigan (1904)
Cadillac Motor Car Company Amsterdam Street Plant (1905)
Frank H. Leavenworth Residence (1905) 107 Pingree Street.
Pontchartrain Hotel (1907) 660 Woodward Avenue. Demolished in 1920
Mitchell Brothers Company Building, Cadillac, Michigan (1907)
Ann Arbor Railroad Depot (1907) 100 East Chapel, Cadillac, Mihigan.
Dwight Cutler Residence (1907) 100 West Kirby Street.
Michigan Motor Sales (1908) 3632-3634 Woodward Avenue. Demolished in 1960s
Walter J. Gamble Residence (1908) 606 Taylor.
Ralph E. Collins Residence (1908) 269 Mack Avenue. Demolished in 1960s
61 Edison (1909)
George H. Woolley Residence (1910) 74 Chicago Boulevard.
Clarence S. Vaughn Residence (1910) 803 Longfellow.
Detroit Fire & Marine Insurance Company Building (1912) 625 Shelby.
Lemuel W. Bowen Residence (1912) 5435 Woodward Avenue.
Frank J. Mooney Residence (1912) 929 West Boston Boulevard.
Frederick W. Kippel Residence (1913) 2233 Iroquois Street.
WIlliam C. Rands Residence (1913) 5229 Cass Avenue.
Detroit Legal News Building (1914) 610 West Congress.
Albert L. Stephens Residence (1914) 7930 East Jefferson Avenue. Demolished in 1962.
35 Massachusetts (1914) Highland Park, Michigan.
1023 Parker (1914)
A.T Farrell Residence (1914) 925 North Michigan, Saginaw, Michigan
Orla B. Taylor Residence (1915) 1725 Burns Street.
Donald J. McDonald Residence (1916) 1616 West Boston Boulevard.
John W. Staley Residence (1916) 1040 Harvard, Grosse Pointe Park, Michigan.
1504 Longfellow (1916)
Fremont Woodruff Residence (1916) 1 Donovan Place, Grosse Pointe, Michigan.
Lincoln Motor Company Administration Building (1917) 6200 West Warren. Demolished in 2005.
Dr. George Fay Residence (1917) 2253 Burns.
John T. Woodhouse Residence (1917) 33 Old Brook Lane, Grosse Pointe Farms, Michigan.
William M. Dwight Residence (1917) 451 Lodge.
7614 Dexter (1917)
Railway Express Ageny Building(1918) 1250 Howard. Demolished in 1960s
Frederick J. Fisher Residence (1918) 54 Arden Park Boulevard.
Charles T. Fisher Residence (1922) 670 West Boston Boulevard.
Detroit Savings Bank (1923) 14440 Charlevoix. Demolished.
Trinity United Methodist Church (1922), 13100 Woodward Avenue, Highland Park, Michigan.
Third Church of Christ Scientist (1923) 620 Seward.
Detroit Yacht Club (1923) 1 Riverbank Road.
3215 West Dobson Place (1923) Ann Arbor, Michigan.
Presbyterian Church of the Redeemer (1924)  2764 West Grand Boulevard. Demolished in 2017.
Edwin S. George Residence (1924) 1340 West Long Lake Road, Bloomfield Hills, Michigan.
Dearborn High School (1925) 835 Mason, Dearborn, Michigan.
Christ Evangelical Lutheran Church (1925) 756 West Philadelphia St.
Brewster Pilgrim Congregational Church (1925) 7625 Linwood.
Garrison First Methodist Episcopal Church (1925) 22124 Garrison, Dearborn, Michigan.
Frank E. Fisher Residence (1925) 1175 Three Mile Drive, Grosse Pointe Park, Michigan.
Dr. George E. Fay Residence (1925) 784 Berkshire, Grosse Pointe Park, Michigan.
Broadway Exchange Building (1926) 342-1346 Broadway.
Detroit Masonic Temple (1926) 500 Temple.
Harley G. Higbie Residence (1926) 201 Lake Shore Drive, Grosse Pointe Farms, Michigan. Demolished in 1988.
Standard Savings Building (1927) 1 Griswold.
Great Lakes Theatre (1927) 14828-14830 Grand River Avenue. Demolished in 1999.
Orient Theatre (1927) 8450 Linwood Avenue.
Gem Theatre (1927) Moved from 62 Columbia to 353 Madison in 1997.
Dearborn Masons Lodge #172 (1928) 907 Monroe, Dearborn, Mighigan.
Gabriel Richard Elementary School (1928) 13840 Lappin.
Central Woodward Christian Church (1928) 9000 Woodward Avenue.
Detroit Press Building.(1929) 2751 East Jefferson Avenue.
Ulysses S. Grant Elementary School (1929) 7479 Stockton.
First English Evangelical Lutheran Church House (1929) 3619 Mt Elliot.
Lynn McNaughton Residence (1929) 109 Kenwood Road, Grosse Pointe Farms, Michigan.
Dr. J. Milton Robb Residence (1929) 315 Lakeland, Grosse Pointe Farms, Michigan.
Albert H. Schmidt Residence (1930) 15840 Lakeview Court, Grosse Pointe Farms, Michigan.
Young Women's Christian Association Building (1931) 3130 Woodward Avenue, Highland Park, Michigan.
18903 Fairfield (1936)
Detroit College of Law Building (1937) 130 East Elizabeth. Demolished in 1990s
Mayflower Congregational Church (1937) 7301 Curtis.
S. P. Blasier Residence (1937) 66 Sunningdale, Grosse Pointe Shores Michigan.
Robert A. Foster Residence (1938) 66 Renaud  Grosse Pointe Shores Michigan. Demolished.
Sixth Church of Christ Scientist (1939) 14710 Kercheval.
Zina Pitcher Elementary School (1948) 19779 Stahelin.
Saint James Lutheran Church (1948) 170 McMillan. Grosse Pointe Farms, Michigan.
Grosse Pointe United Methodist Church (1950) 211 Moross, Grosse Pointe Farms, Michigan.
Grosse Pointe Congregational Church (1950) 240 Chalfonte, Grosse Pointe Farms, Michigan.
Kirk in the Hills Presbyterian Church (1958) 1340 West Long Lake Road, Bloomfield Hills, Michigan.

See also
Architecture of metropolitan Detroit

References

Further reading

Kvaran, Einar Einarsson, Architectural Sculpture in America, unpublished manuscript.
Masonic Temple, Detroit, Michigan  A.D. 1926,  A.L. 5926  dedication booklette, no date, copyright or publishing information.
Parducci, Corrado, Work Records of Corrado J. Parducci, unpublished manuscript.

External links

Historic Detroit — George D. Mason

1856 births
Culture of Detroit
1948 deaths
Architects from Syracuse, New York
Architects from Detroit
19th-century American architects
20th-century American architects
American railway architects